Ships of the Night is a 1928 American silent adventure film directed by Duke Worne and starring Jacqueline Logan, Sôjin Kamiyama and Jack Mower.

Cast
 Jacqueline Logan as Johanna Hearne 
 Sôjin Kamiyama as Yut Sen 
 Jack Mower as Dan Meloy 
 Andy Clyde as Alec 
 Arthur Rankin as Donald Hearne 
 Glen Cavender as Cramsey 
 Thomas A. Curran as Chief of Police 
 Frank Lanning as Moja 
 J.P. McGowan as Motilla 
 Frank Moran as First Mate

References

Bibliography
 Palmer, Scott. British Film Actors' Credits, 1895-1987. McFarland, 1988.

External links

1928 films
1928 adventure films
American adventure films
Films directed by Duke Worne
American silent feature films
1920s English-language films
Rayart Pictures films
American black-and-white films
1920s American films
Silent adventure films